Rock Island Pool is a reservoir on the Columbia River in the U.S. state of Washington. It was created in 1933 with the construction of Rock Island Dam. The reservoir stretches from there upstream to the Rocky Reach Dam.

See also
 List of dams in the Columbia River watershed

References

Bodies of water of Chelan County, Washington
Bodies of water of Douglas County, Washington
Reservoirs in Washington (state)
Protected areas of Chelan County, Washington
Protected areas of Douglas County, Washington
1933 establishments in Washington (state)